The 2016 WNBA season of the Minnesota Lynx is the 18th season in the Women's National Basketball Association (WNBA). The Lynx were the defending WNBA champions.  The Lynx finished with a record of 28–6, finishing first in the Western Conference (and the league as a whole) and qualifying for the playoffs.  Minnesota advanced to their second straight Finals. Their 2016 roster included five competitors in the 2016 Rio Olympics (Maya Moore, Lindsay Whalen, Sylvia Fowles, and Seimone Augustus of the U.S. squad and Anna Cruz of the Spanish team) as well as seven current or previous all-stars (Moore, Whalen, Fowles, Augustus, Rebekkah Brunson, Jia Perkins and Renee Montgomery) with an astonishing 22 total past selections to the all-star game between them.

Draft picks

The Lynx made three selections in the 2016 WNBA Entry Draft in Uncasville, Connecticut:

Roster

Game log

Preseason 

|- style=
| 1
| May 5 
| New York Liberty
| 
| 
| 
| 
| 
|

Standings

Regular season 

|- style="background:#bfb"
| 1
|
|Phoenix Mercury 
| 
|  
| 
| 
| 
|  1–0
|- style="background:#bfb"
| 2
|
|Chicago Sky
| 
|  
| 
| 
| 
|  2–0
|-style="background:#bfb"
| 3
|
|Seattle Storm
| 
|  
| 
| 
| 
| 3–0
|- style="background:#bfb"
| 4
|
|Phoenix Mercury 
| 
|  
| 
| 
| 
|  4–0
|- style="background:#bfb"
| 5
|
|Indiana Fever
| 
|  
| 
| 
| 
|  5–0
|- style="background:#bfb"
| 6
|
|New York Liberty
| 
|  
| 
| 
| 
|  6–0

Playoffs

The Lynx qualified for the 2016 playoffs, and, as the team with the best regular season record in the WNBA, received two automatic byes, advancing straight to the best-of-five semifinal against the eighth-seeded Phoenix Mercury.  They swept the Mercury three games to none to advance to the 2016 WNBA Finals.

|- style=
| 1
| September 28
| Phoenix Mercury season
|
| Maya Moore (31)
| Sylvia Fowles (10)
| 
| 
|
|- style=
| 2
| September 30
| Phoenix Mercury season
|
| Maya Moore (26)
| Rebekkah Brunson (11)
| 
| 
|
|- style=
| 3
| October 2
| Phoenix Mercury season
|
| Maya Moore  (20)
| Rebekkah Brunson (9)
| 
| 
|

Transactions

Additions

Awards

References

Notes

External links
The Official Site of the Minnesota Lynx

Minnesota Lynx seasons
Minnesota
2016 in sports in Minnesota